Björn Glasner (born 5 May 1973) is a German former professional cyclist.

Major results
2000
 1st Stage 4 Bayern-Rundfahrt
2002
 1st Stage 2 Giro del Capo
2004
 1st Overall Rheinland-Pfalz Rundfahrt
2007
 1st Overall Tour de East Java
1st Stages 2 & 3
 1st Stage 4 Rheinland-Pfalz Rundfahrt
2008
1st Stage 5 Tour of Thailand

References

External links

1973 births
Living people
German male cyclists
People from Bad Neuenahr-Ahrweiler
Cyclists from Rhineland-Palatinate